William Chidi Njoku (born March 5, 1972) is a Ghanaian-Canadian former professional basketball player and member of the Canada national men's basketball team.

A 6'9½" forward born in Accra, Ghana, Njoku immigrated to Canada as a four-year-old along with his parents Lawrence and Catherine.  He starred for Halifax West High School despite missing most of his senior year through injury.  The Warriors consequently did not reach the provincial championship finals tournament in 1990.  Will attended hometown Saint Mary's University, where in his junior year (1993) he was winner of the Mike Moser Award as the Canadian Interuniversity Sport's (CIAU) Most Outstanding player.  In his junior and senior seasons he was also named a CIAU All-Canadian.  Njoku was drafted in the second round of the 1994 NBA Draft with the 41st pick overall by the Indiana Pacers.

Failing to make any NBA regular season roster however, Njoku played professionally for the next ten years for various clubs in Europe.  He retired in 1999 due to a chronic back ailment, one which was properly diagnosed and successfully treated allowing him to make a comeback to pro ball at age 31 in 2003.  This is a mostly complete list of the clubs by year:
Elan Sportif Chalonnais, (Pro A), 1994
Jersey Turnpikes, USBL, 1995   
Atlantic City Seagulls, USBL, 1996
Alba Berlin, Germany, autumn of 1996
Besiktas, Turkey, 1997
Illianbum Taka, Portugal, 1998
Oliveirense, Portugal, 1999
KB Bashkimi, Kosovo, 2003
Eurolines Vilvoorde, Belgium, 2003-4
KK Rabotnički, Republic of Macedonia, 2004

Njoku also played in France.

Njoku was a member of the Canadian team at the 1994 FIBA World Championship as well as the 1998 Championship.  In 2007, he also played for the Canadian national developmental team in a tournament in Argentina.

Since retiring from playing pro basketball, Njoku has been involved in coaching and motivational speaking.  Having lived in Toronto for the off-seasons during much of his playing career, he now resides in Moncton, New Brunswick.  He was the Athletics Director at Crandall University from Sept 2007 - Sept 2010, when he left to focus on his motivational speaking company, Will2Win.

Sources
www.eurobasket.com
www.basket-stats.info
www.thedraftreview.com
www.turkishdailynew.com.tr
www.espndeportes.espn.go.com
curtisjphillips.tripod.com
www.berlinonline.de
www.will2win.ca

External links
Njoku's personal website
CIS Awards Listing

1972 births
Living people
Alba Berlin players
Atlantic City Seagulls players
Bashkimi Prizren players
Basketball people from Nova Scotia
Beşiktaş men's basketball players
Black Canadian basketball players
Canadian expatriate basketball people in Belgium
Canadian expatriate basketball people in France
Canadian expatriate basketball people in Germany
Canadian expatriate basketball people in Turkey
Canadian expatriate basketball people in the United States
Canadian expatriate basketball people in Kosovo
Canadian expatriate basketball people in Portugal
Canadian expatriate basketball people in North Macedonia
Canadian men's basketball players
Ghanaian emigrants to Canada
Canadian sportspeople of African descent
Élan Chalon players
Indiana Pacers draft picks
KK Rabotnički players
Naturalized citizens of Canada
Power forwards (basketball)
Saint Mary's Huskies basketball players
San Diego Wildcards players
Sportspeople from Accra
1998 FIBA World Championship players
1994 FIBA World Championship players